Suyuparina (possibly from Aymara suyu land lot, district, region, parina flamingo) is a mountain in the Vilcanota mountain range in the Andes of Peru, about  high. It is located in the Cusco Region, Canchis Province, Pitumarca District, and in the Quispicanchi Province, Marcapata District. Suyuparina lies south of the peak of Yanajasa and northeast of Sacsa Ananta, Condoriquiña and Istalla. The mountain is situated east of the Parina valley. Its intermittent stream flows to Arasa River (Araza) in the north.

See also
 List of mountains in Peru
 List of mountains in the Andes

References

Mountains of Cusco Region
Mountains of Peru
Glaciers of Peru